Stéphane Pierre Yves Guivarc'h (born 6 September 1970) is a French former professional footballer who played as striker. He featured in the France squad that won the 1998 FIFA World Cup on home soil.

His early career was spent in France with the Breton clubs Stade Brestois and En Avant Guingamp before moving to AJ Auxerre, where he won Ligue 1 in 1996. He returned to Brittany with Stade Rennais with whom he won Ligue 1's Golden Boot. At a second spell at Auxerre he retained the Golden Boot in Ligue 1 and also won the Golden Boot for the 1997–98 UEFA Cup. That summer he started in the World Cup Final.

Guivarc'h left France for Newcastle United of the Premier League after the World Cup but left after three months having failed to make an impact at St James' Park. He finished the season at Rangers FC of the Scottish Premier League with medals in the league and Scottish League Cup, of which he scored in the final. He then returned to Auxerre before retiring after the 2001–02 season with En Avant Guingamp.

Early life
Guivarc'h was born in Concarneau, Finistère.

Club career

Brest, Guingamp, Auxerre and Rennes
Guivarc'h's career started at the Breton club Stade Brestois in 1989. In 1991, he moved to another club in the region, En Avant Guingamp, where his goalscoring rate was better than one every two games (68 in 110 league games), prompting a move to AJ Auxerre in 1995. He played for the club as they won a double of Ligue 1 and Coupe de France in 1995–96, under manager Guy Roux, but only scored 3 goals in 23 league appearances. After a season at Auxerre, he returned to a third Breton club, Stade Rennais for a single season, where he won the Ligue 1 Golden Boot for 22 goals in 36 appearances.

Auxerre 1997–98
Guivarc'h's Golden Boot-winning season prompted a return to Auxerre only one year after leaving them. He retained the Ligue 1 Golden Boot, rewarded for 21 goals in 32 league appearances.

Guivarc'h scored seven times in the UEFA Cup in 1997–98 to earn its Golden Boot. The first goal came in the First Round's First leg against Deportivo La Coruña of Spain in a 2–1 win. The second leg was goalless. In the second round against OFI Crete of Greece, he scored twice in the home leg in a 3–1 victory (Antoine Sibierski got the other goal) and once in the second in a 3–2 defeat (5–4 on aggregate). In the third round's second leg against Twente Enschede of the Netherlands, he scored an 82nd-minute penalty in the 2–0 victory at home to send Auxerre through 3–0 on aggregate.

In the quarter-finals against Lazio of Italy, Auxerre lost the first leg 1–0 away. In the second leg Guivarc'h struck twice in a 2–2 draw which meant that Lazio advanced 3–2 on aggregate.

Newcastle United and Rangers
Guivarc'h was signed for Newcastle United by their manager Kenny Dalglish in the 1998 close season. He played four league games, scoring on his debut against Liverpool, then was sold to Rangers for £3.5m on 6 November 1998 by new manager Ruud Gullit.

At Rangers he won the treble under Dick Advocaat: the Scottish Premier League, Scottish Cup and Scottish League Cup. Two days after signing, he scored two goals away at St Johnstone after coming on as a substitute in a 7–0 win. He also scored two away at Heart of Midlothian in a 3–2 win. He scored Rangers' first in the League Cup final versus St Johnstone, which they won 2–1.

Auxerre and Guingamp
After only one season at Rangers he joined Auxerre for a third spell, then for his final season as a professional returned to Guingamp once more. During his two spells at the Breton club he scored 69 goals, a club record.

International career 
As a result of his domestic goalscoring record Guivarc'h was selected as the lone striker in the World Cup winning France team of 1998. He was given the number 9 shirt by manager Aime Jacquet. In the opening victory over South Africa (3–0) Guivarc'h was substituted for Christophe Dugarry in the 29th minute. He did not play at all in the following 4–0 victory over Saudi Arabia.

In the Last 16 against Paraguay he came on in the 76th minute for his Auxerre teammate Bernard Diomede. France won 1–0 after extra-time with a golden-goal from Laurent Blanc. Guivarc'h was booked in the quarter-final against Italy and substituted in the 65th minute with Christian Karembeu for Thierry Henry and David Trezeguet. France won on penalties when the game finished 0–0 after extra-time. In the semi-final versus Croatia Guivarc'h was again substituted for Trezeguet in the 68th minute as France won 2–1.

In the final against Brazil he was substituted in the 66th minute for Christophe Dugarry as France won 3–0.

Personal life
Guivarc'h was appointed a Knight of the Legion of Honour in 1998 after the World Cup victory.

Since retirement as a player, Guivarc'h has returned to his hometown of Concarneau and become a swimming pool salesman. He is married and has three children.

Despite the criticism, France's World Cup-winning manager Aimé Jacquet supported Guivarc'h's performances for his ability to contribute as a pivot despite not scoring in the tournament. He remains incredulous that the striker is perceived as a flop.

International goals	
Scores and results list France's goal tally first, score column indicates score after each Guivarc'h goal.

Honours
Auxerre
Division 1: 1995–96

Rangers
Scottish Premier League: 1998–99
Scottish League Cup: 1997–98

France
FIFA World Cup: 1998

Individual
Division 1 Golden Boot: 1996–97, 1997–98
UEFA Cup Golden Boot: 1997–98

Orders
Knight of the Legion of Honour: 1998

References

External links
http://www.fff.fr/servfff/historique/historique.php?cherche_joueur=GUIVA&submit=go

1970 births
Living people
People from Concarneau
Sportspeople from Finistère
Association football forwards
French footballers
French expatriate footballers
Expatriate footballers in England
Expatriate footballers in Scotland
French expatriate sportspeople in England
French expatriate sportspeople in Scotland
France international footballers
Footballers from Brittany
AJ Auxerre players
Newcastle United F.C. players
Rangers F.C. players
Stade Rennais F.C. players
En Avant Guingamp players
Stade Brestois 29 players
1998 FIFA World Cup players
FIFA World Cup-winning players
Premier League players
Scottish Premier League players
Ligue 1 players
Ligue 2 players
Championnat National players
Chevaliers of the Légion d'honneur
Trégunc
French people of Breton descent